Weston Theater Company (formerly known as Weston Playhouse Theatre Company) is a theater company in Weston, Vermont, United States of America.

For over 85 years, Weston has flourished as a home for exceptional theater in a wonderful community. At both The Playhouse, with its rich history, and our modern Walker Farm venue, Weston Theater Company presents beautiful, entertaining stories performed by astonishingly talented artists from near and far. For all of those years, the town and community have been at the heart of our work. Everything Weston does—every moment of story, imagination, and innovation—is grounded in their history and contributes to the future of the place they call home. The theater was involved with Emmy Award-winning actor Christopher Lloyd, and Tony Award-winning designer John Lee Beatty at the beginnings of their careers.

References

Theatre companies in Vermont
Weston, Vermont